Dekkiche is a surname. Notable people with the surname include:

Abdesslem Dekkiche (born 1986), Algerian basketball player
Yacine Dekkiche (born 1980), French rugby league and rugby union player